Redtenbacheria insignis is a European species of fly in the family Tachinidae. It is the type species of the genus Redtenbacheria.

References

Phasiinae
Diptera of Europe
Diptera of Asia
Insects described in 1861
Taxa named by Johann Egger